Piero Taruffi (12 October 1906 – 12 January 1988) was a racing driver from Italy.

Sports car career
Taruffi began his motorsport career racing motorcycles. He won the 1932 500cc European Championship on a Norton and in 1937 set the motorcycle land speed record at 279.503 km/h (173.68 mph).

Taruffi drove a newly introduced 2-litre, 4-cylinder Ferrari, which placed third in the 360 kilometre race Grand Prix de Bari at Bari, Italy, in September 1951. He finished behind Juan Manuel Fangio and Froilán González with a time of 2 hours 58 minutes 40 3/5 seconds. Taruffi and Alberto Ascari participated in the Carrera Panamericana in the mountains of Mexico in November 1951. They placed first and third respectively over the course from Mexico City to León, Guanajuato, a  leg. Taruffi led second-placed Troy Ruttman by more than four minutes. Taruffi trimmed 15 minutes on the Mexico City-Leon leg and another 21 minutes between Leon and Durango. In the process he climbed from 12th to third overall. Taruffi won the race on 25 November, with a time of 21:57:52, over mountains and plains of the southeastern tip of Mexico. He had an average speed of 87.6 mph (140.97 km/h).

He attempted a  record but his motor burned out after . Taruffi was in a two-litre Ferrari for the running of the third Grand Prix de France, in Paris in May 1952. Taruffi placed second to Fangio in the 1953 Carrera Panamericana, with a time of 18:18:51 in a Lancia. His time was better than the previous year when he was victorious. In March 1954, Taruffi lost the Florida International Grand Prix with an hour to go, after having led the first three hours, when his Lancia stopped. He pushed it to the pits and team mechanics began working on it with diligence. Taruffi was still out of the car when the O.S.C.A. shared by Stirling Moss and Bill Lloyd crossed the finish line. Taruffi had averaged  before he retired. Taruffi won the  Tour of Sicily in April 1954. His time of 10 hours 24 minutes 37 seconds established a record for an event which opened Italy's sports car racing season. It was 14 years old at the time. He averaged  in a Lancia 3300.

Taruffi and Harry Schell placed fifth overall in the 1955 Florida Grand Prix, driving a Ferrari. Taruffi dropped out of the 1955 Mille Miglia, when he encountered a broken oil pump on the course north of Rome. He and eventual winner, Stirling Moss, were vying for the lead in the early stages of the race. Cesare Perdisa won by 22 seconds in the 1955 Grand Prix of Imola, driving a two-litre Maserati. Taruffi spun his car into a straw bale at the edge of the track on the first lap. He was uninjured, though his car was damaged, and he was forced to retire from the race. Jean Behra and Taruffi teamed to secure a fifth-place finish in a Maserati at the 1956 12 Hours of Sebring. Taruffi established a world record for Class E cars in June 1956. He raced  in 46 minutes 27.2 seconds, an average of 129.9 miles per hour (209.04 km/h). Also at Monza, Taruffi broke the one-hour mark of 212.543 kilometres per hour (132.074 mph). A third record he performed was for 200 kilometres. His time was 53 minutes 14.5 seconds. In the 17th running of the Tour of Sicily, in 1957, Taruffi had a small crash while in pursuit of leader Olivier Gendebien. He touched the wall in Gioiosa Marea but continued in his Maserati. Gendebien won in a Ferrari. The event was marred by the death of J. Olivari who was burned to death when his Maserati hit a wall in one of the course's 11,000 curves.

Taruffi's final triumph was at the 1957 Mille Miglia, the last competitive edition of the famous Italian race. At this tragic race, Alfonso de Portago crashed his car into the crowd, with great loss of life. Taruffi won in a Ferrari 315 S. Following the race he pledged to his wife, Isabella, that he would never race again. He was 50 years of age.

Author and patent holder
Taruffi was the author of the book, The Technique of Motor Racing. In November 1957
the Saturday Evening Post published Taruffi's article, Stop us before we kill again. The former racer discussed the 1955 Le Mans and 1957 Mille Miglia races in which drivers and numerous spectators died.

In August 1952 Taruffi protected a racing car design under patent 2,608, 264. The patent had three torpedo-shaped parallel bodies joined together. Independent twin motors and wheels were in the two larger bodies, at left and right. The driver and the passengers sit in the car's central part. The central portion is both higher and smaller than the others. Taruffi commented on the low wind resistance and low centre of gravity of his design.

Formula One
He participated in 18 World Championship Grands Prix, debuting on 3 September 1950. He won one race and scored a total of 41 championship points. He also participated in numerous non-championship Formula One races.

Taruffi drove a Ferrari to victory in the May 1952 Swiss Grand Prix. He led from the start, with the Ferrari of Rudolf Fischer coming in second.

Museum
The Piero Taruffi museum is in Bagnoregio, a small town between Viterbo and Orvieto in Central Italy. It has vintage cars and motorbikes of his era.

Stock cars
Taruffi drove a Ford stock car owned by Floyd Clymer of Los Angeles in the  Pan-American race held in November 1954.

Complete World Championship Grand Prix results 
(key) (Races in italics indicate fastest lap)

* Indicates shared drive with Juan Manuel Fangio† Indicates shared drive with Paul Frère

Non-Championship Formula One results
(key) (Races in bold indicate pole position, races in italics indicate fastest lap)

References

1906 births
1988 deaths
People from Albano Laziale
Italian racing drivers
Italian Formula One drivers
Italian motorcycle racers
Formula One race winners
Alfa Romeo Formula One drivers
Ferrari Formula One drivers
Mercedes-Benz Formula One drivers
Maserati Formula One drivers
Vanwall Formula One drivers
24 Hours of Le Mans drivers
Motorcycle land speed record people
World Sportscar Championship drivers
European Championship drivers
Grand Prix drivers
Sportspeople from the Metropolitan City of Rome Capital
Carrera Panamericana drivers